Furuta (written: 古田) is a Japanese surname. Notable people with the surname include:

, Japanese actor
, Japanese baseball player and player-manager 
, Japanese football player
, Japanese politician
, Japanese football player
, Japanese murder victim
, Imperial Japanese Navy dive bomber pilot
, Japanese daimyō
, Japanese basketball player
, Japanese social reformer, educator, radio and television personality, and politician
, Japanese samurai
, Japanese football player
, Japanese astronomer
, Japanese swimmer
, Japanese hurdler
, Japanese jurist

Japanese-language surnames